The 2013–14 Federal Hockey League season was the fourth season of the Federal Hockey League.

Regular season 

 Advanced to playoffs

Playoffs

External links 
 Federal Hockey League website

2013
Federal